Bavayia exsuccida, also known as the sclerophyll bavayia, is a species of geckos endemic to North Province, New Caledonia. As of 2022, it is known from only one locality, with an extent of occurrence of 8 sq km.

The species name exsuccida derives from the Latin exsuccus, meaning "without juice" or "without sap", and refers the sclerophyll vegetation of the dry forests in which this species is found.

References

Bavayia
Reptiles described in 1998
Taxa named by Aaron M. Bauer
Taxa named by Anthony Whitaker
Taxa named by Ross Allen Sadlier
Geckos of New Caledonia